RadNet is an American radiology firm. The company operates outpatient diagnostic imaging centers. RadNet is the largest provider of outpatient imaging services in the United States.

History 
RadNet was founded in 1981 as a small imaging center in Los Angeles. The nascent company was concerned with providing billing and administrative services to large medical care providers, with the initial RadNet imaging center being located near Cedars-Sinai Medical Center.  

In 1992 the company was bought by Primedex Health Systems, a California-based management company that catered to small medical clinics. In addition, much of Primedex's business was focused around dealing with workers' compensation claims. At the time of Primedex's acquisition of RadNet, the larger company was going through a period of rapid expansion; however, this growth was cut short in 1993 when the State of California implemented statuary changes to the way workers' compensation was managed. The changes made by California forced Primedex to switch its business focus, resulting in more funding being allocated for other services. Many of the company's new initiatives were centered around diagnostic imaging services, which were managed by RadNet. This growth within the greater Primedex conglomerate resulted in RadNet gaining considerable influence. By the end of the 1990s, RadNet had replaced effectively Primedex as the parent company, with many of Primedex's assets being folded into subsidiaries of RadNet. 

In the early 2000s RadNet began a period of business expansion by acquiring smaller radiology firms and incorporating said firm's practice into RadNet's growing list of assets. The company repurchased its debt in 2005 and in 2006 worked with General Electric to secure a $450 million syndicated loan with which to continue its corporate acquisitions. 2006 also saw RadNet and Primedex split their stock, resulting in RadNet becoming the official parent company and Primedex becoming a subsidiary.

RadNet joined the S&P 600 in November 2019, replacing American newspaper provider Gannett Co.

Operations 
As of 2020 RadNet has continued to execute its plan for the strategic acquisition of new assets, namely smaller imaging centers. The company has also begun to open new outpatient centers to work with existing healthcare networks. RadNet also moved to acquire DeepHealth, a machine learning firm working to develop radiology artificial intelligence.

References 

American companies established in 1981